Wolin (formerly  ) is the name both of a Polish island in the Baltic Sea, just off the Polish coast, and a town on that island. Administratively, the island belongs to the West Pomeranian Voivodeship. Wolin is separated from the island of Usedom (Uznam) by the Strait of Świna, and from mainland Pomerania by the Strait of Dziwna. The number of inhabitants is 30,000.

Water from the river Oder flows into the Szczecin Lagoon and from there through the Peene west of Usedom, Świna and Dziwna into the Bay of Pomerania in the Baltic Sea.

Most of the island consists of forests and postglacial hills. In the middle is the Wolin National Park. The island is the main tourist attraction of northwestern Poland, and it is crossed by several specially marked tourist trails, such as a  trail from Międzyzdroje to Dziwnówek. There is a main, electrified rail line, which connects Szczecin and Świnoujście, plus the international road E65 (national road 3 / S3 expressway) crosses the island.

Some etymologists believe that the name is related to the name of the ancient historical region of Volhynia. The origins of the name then would come from the resettled Volynians who named the island Volyn.

History 

The ford across the river Dziwna on which Wolin is located has been used as far back as the Stone Age. Archaeological excavations of soil layers indicate that there was a settlement in the area during the Migration period, at the turn of the 5th and 6th centuries. The place was then abandoned for approximately one hundred years. At the end of the 8th or the beginning of the 9th century, the area was levelled and a new settlement constructed. The earliest evidence of fortifications dates to the first half of the 9th century. In the second half of the 9th century, there was a central fortified area and two suburbs, to the north and south of the center. These became enclosed and fortified between the end of the 9th and the 10th centuries.

A medieval document from the mid-9th century, called the Bavarian Geographer after its anonymous creator, mentions the Slavic tribe of Wolinians who had 70 strongholds at that time (Uelunzani civitates LXX). The town of Wolin was first mentioned in 965, by Ibrahim ibn Jakub, who referred to the place as Weltaba.

The period of greatest development during the medieval period occurred between the 9th and the 11th centuries. Around 896 AD a new port was constructed and the main part of the town acquired new, stronger fortifications, including a wooden palisade made of halved 50-centimetre wide tree trunks, a rampart and a retaining wall.

Archaeologists believe that in the Early Middle Ages Wolin was a great trade emporium, spreading along the shore for four kilometres and rivalling in importance Birka and Hedeby.

In 967 the island became controlled by Poland, under the country's first historic ruler, Duke Mieszko I. However, it has not been established if Wolin became directly part of Poland, or if it was a fief. Mieszko I encompassed the town of Wolin with defensive ramparts. Polish influences were not firm and they ended around 1007. In the following years, Wolin became famous for its pirates, who would plunder ships cruising the Baltic. As a reprisal, in 1043 it was attacked by the Norwegian king Magnus the Good.

In the early 12th century the island, as part of the Pomeranian duchy, was captured by the Polish monarch Boleslaw III Wrymouth. Shortly after, the inhabitants of Wolin accepted Christianity, and in 1140 pope Innocent II created a diocese there, with its capital in the town of Wolin. In 1170 the battle at Julin Bridge took place there. In 1185 the dukes of Pomerania became vassals of Denmark, and in 1227 they fell under suzerainty of the Holy Roman Empire.

In 1535 Wolin accepted Protestant Lutheranism. In 1630, during the Thirty Years' War, the island was captured by Sweden. It passed to the Kingdom of Prussia in 1720 as a result of the Treaty of Stockholm. From 1871, the island was part of the German Empire. After Nazi Germany's defeat in World War II, it became again part of Poland.

Connection with Jomsborg and Vineta 
Archaeological finds on the island are not very rich but they dot an area of 20 hectares, making it the second largest Baltic marketplace of the Viking Age after Hedeby. Some scholars have speculated that Wolin may have been the basis for the semi-legendary settlements Jomsborg and Vineta. However, others have rejected the identification, or even the historical existence of Jomsborg and Vineta (for example, Gerard Labuda).

Gwyn Jones notes that the size of the town was exaggerated in contemporary sources, for example by Adam of Bremen who claimed Wolin/Jomsborg was "the largest town in Europe".  Archaeological excavations, however, have found no evidence of a harbor big enough for 360 warships (as claimed by Adam) or of a major citadel. The town was inhabited by both Slavs and Scandinavians.

A golden disc bearing the name of Harald Bluetooth and Jomsborg appeared in Sweden in autumn 2014. The disc, also called the Curmsun Disc, is made of high gold content and has a weight of 25,23 gram. On the obverse there is a Latin inscription and on the reverse there is a Latin cross with four dots surrounded by an octagonal ridge. The inscription reads: "+ARALD CVRMSVN+REX AD TANER+SCON+JVMN+CIV ALDIN+" and translates as "Harald Gormsson king of Danes, Scania, Jomsborg, town Aldinburg".

It is assumed that the disc was a part of a Viking hoard found in 1840 in the Polish village Wiejkowo near the town of Wolin by Heinrich Boldt, the maternal great-great-grandfather of Hollywood actors and producers Ben Affleck and Casey Affleck.

The disc was rediscovered in 2014 by an eleven year old schoolgirl who found it in an old casket and then brought it to school.

Sights
Among the natural, historic and tourist sights of Wolin are:
Wolin National Park
Świnoujście Lighthouse, one of the tallest lighthouses in the world, the tallest lighthouse in Poland, and tallest brick lighthouse in the world
the town of Międzyzdroje with its beach, pier, Nature Museum of the Woliński National Park, wax museum, Walk of Fame (Promenada Gwiazd), Baltic Miniature Park (Bałtycki Park Miniatur), and spa park with the monument of Fryderyk Chopin
Gothic Saint Nicholas church in Wolin
Regional Museum in Wolin
Gerhard's Fort of Świnoujście Fortress with the Coastal Defense Museum (Muzeum Obrony Wybrzeża) in Świnoujście

Culture 

Annually, the island is home to Europe's biggest Germanic-Slavic Viking festival.

The officially protected traditional alcoholic beverage of Wolin is Trójniak woliński leśny (as designated by the Ministry of Agriculture and Rural Development of Poland). It is a type of local Polish mead of 12-14% alcohol by volume.

Places on Wolin

Towns
 Dziwnów
 Międzyzdroje
 Świnoujście
 Wolin

Villages

 Dargobądz
 Darzowice
 Domysłów
 Jarzębowo
 Kodrąb
 Kołczewo
 Ładzin
 Łuskowo
 Międzywodzie
 Mokrzyca Mała
 Mokrzyca Wielka
 Rabiąż
 Świętouść
 Warnowo
 Wapnica
 Wicko
 Wisełka

Transport
Polish National roads 3 and 93, and Voivodeship road 102, pass through the island. The Solidarity Szczecin–Goleniów Airport is located approximately 60 km from the island.

Distances 
Szczecin-Goleniów "Solidarność" Airport ~ 60 km
Szczecin ~ 90 km
Police ~ 110 km
Berlin ~ 220 km
Rostock ~ 240 km
Copenhagen ~ 250 km
Malmö ~ 250 km
Warsaw ~ 650 km

See also
 Curmsun Disc
 Jomsborg
 Jomsvikings

References

External links 
Map of Wolin

Polish islands in the Baltic
Islands of Poland
Landforms of West Pomeranian Voivodeship
Jomsvikings